Chaetogonopteron is a genus of flies in the family Dolichopodidae.

Species

 Chaetogonopteron acuticorne (Frey, 1928)
 Chaetogonopteron aechmophorum (Meuffels & Grootaert, 1987)
 Chaetogonopteron albifimbriatum (Parent, 1932)
 Chaetogonopteron albiserratum (Meuffels & Grootaert, 1987)
 Chaetogonopteron aldabricum Meuffels & Grootaert, 2009
 Chaetogonopteron alipes (Meuffels & Grootaert, 1987)
 Chaetogonopteron anacrostichum (Meuffels & Grootaert, 1987)
 Chaetogonopteron anae Wang, Yang & Grootaert, 2005
 Chaetogonopteron apicale (De Meijere, 1916)
 Chaetogonopteron appendicitum (Parent, 1932)
 Chaetogonopteron appendiculatum De Meijere, 1914
 Chaetogonopteron araneipes (Meuffels & Grootaert, 1987)
 Chaetogonopteron argentipes (De Meijere, 1916)
 Chaetogonopteron argyropus (Parent, 1932)
 Chaetogonopteron arunense (Hollis, 1964)
 Chaetogonopteron bartaki Olejnicek & Kubik, 2007
 Chaetogonopteron basipunctatum Yang, 2002
 †Chaetogonopteron bethnorrisae Bickel, 2009
 Chaetogonopteron bisulcum (Becker, 1922)
 Chaetogonopteron campsicnemoides (Meuffels & Grootaert, 1987)
 Chaetogonopteron candidimanum (Meuffels & Grootaert, 1987)
 Chaetogonopteron capricorne Bickel, 2013
 Chaetogonopteron ceratophorum Yang & Grootaert, 1999
 Chaetogonopteron chaeturum Grootaert & Meuffels, 1999
 Chaetogonopteron cheesmanae Hollis, 1963
 Chaetogonopteron coei (Hollis, 1964)
 Chaetogonopteron collectum (Walker, 1857)
 Chaetogonopteron compressipes (Meuffels & Grootaert, 1987)
 Chaetogonopteron ctenophorum (Meuffels & Grootaert, 1987)
 Chaetogonopteron dayaoshanum Liao, Zhou & Yang, 2008
 Chaetogonopteron daweishanum Yang & Saigusa, 2001
 Chaetogonopteron fimbritibia Hollis, 1963
 Chaetogonopteron flavmarginatum Yang, 2002
 Chaetogonopteron gigas (Meuffels & Grootaert, 1987)
 Chaetogonopteron glaucum (Becker, 1924)
 Chaetogonopteron gloriosum (Frey, 1925)
 Chaetogonopteron guangdongense Zhang, Yang & Grootaert, 2003
 Chaetogonopteron guangxiense Zhang, Yang & Masunaga, 2004
 Chaetogonopteron guizhouense Yang & Saigusa, 2001
 Chaetogonopteron gummigutti (Becker, 1922)
 Chaetogonopteron hainanum Yang, 2002
 Chaetogonopteron hungshuichiense Wang, Yang & Masunaga, 2009
 Chaetogonopteron ictericum (Meuffels & Grootaert, 1987)
 Chaetogonopteron incomptum (Meuffels & Grootaert, 1987)
 Chaetogonopteron intermittens (Becker, 1924)
 Chaetogonopteron kaohsungense Wang, Yang & Masunaga, 2009
 Chaetogonopteron laetum (Becker, 1922)
 Chaetogonopteron leucotarsum (Meuffels & Grootaert, 1987)
 Chaetogonopteron liui Wang, Yang & Grootaert, 2005
 Chaetogonopteron longicercus Liao, Zhou & Yang, 2008
 Chaetogonopteron longum Yang & Saigusa, 2001
 Chaetogonopteron luteoviride (Parent, 1932)
 Chaetogonopteron maculatum (Parent, 1932)
 Chaetogonopteron magnificum (Parent, 1935)
 Chaetogonopteron majus (De Meijere, 1916)
 Chaetogonopteron menglonganum Yang & Grootaert, 1999
 Chaetogonopteron menglunense Yang & Grootaert, 1999
 Chaetogonopteron metallescens (De Meijere, 1916)
 Chaetogonopteron microclidium Bickel, 2016
 Chaetogonopteron millenarium Bickel, 2016
 Chaetogonopteron minutulum (Parent, 1932)
 Chaetogonopteron minutum Yang & Grootaert, 1999
 Chaetogonopteron miritarse (Meuffels & Grootaert, 1987)
 Chaetogonopteron mogiai Bickel, 2016
 Chaetogonopteron mutatum (Parent, 1932)
 Chaetogonopteron nanlingense Zhang, Yang & Grootaert, 2003
 Chaetogonopteron nectarophagum (Curran, 1924)
 Chaetogonopteron nepalense (Hollis, 1964)
 Chaetogonopteron nigrisquame (Meuffels & Grootaert, 1987)
 Chaetogonopteron nodicorne (Becker, 1922)
 Chaetogonopteron obscuratum (Becker, 1924)
 Chaetogonopteron oreibatum Bickel, 2016
 Chaetogonopteron pallantennatum Yang & Grootaert, 1999
 Chaetogonopteron pallipes (Meuffels & Grootaert, 1987)
 Chaetogonopteron pallipilosum Yang & Grootaert, 1999
 Chaetogonopteron plumipes (Parent, 1939)
 Chaetogonopteron plumitarse (De Meijere, 1916)
 Chaetogonopteron priapus (Meuffels & Grootaert, 1987)
 Chaetogonopteron prospicuum (Becker, 1922)
 Chaetogonopteron ripicola (Meuffels & Grootaert, 1987)
 Chaetogonopteron rutilum (Becker, 1922)
 Chaetogonopteron seriatum Yang & Grootaert, 1999
 Chaetogonopteron setigerum (Becker, 1922)
 Chaetogonopteron shettyi Olejnicek, 2002
 †Chaetogonopteron sobrium (Meunier, 1910)
 Chaetogonopteron sticticum (Meuffels & Grootaert, 1987)
 Chaetogonopteron strenuum (Becker, 1922)
 Chaetogonopteron sublaetum Yang & Grootaert, 1999
 Chaetogonopteron taiwanense Wang, Yang & Masunaga, 2009
 Chaetogonopteron tanypteron Bickel, 2016
 Chaetogonopteron tarsale De Meijere, 1916
 Chaetogonopteron tarsatum (Schiner, 1868)
 Chaetogonopteron tenerum (Becker, 1922)
 Chaetogonopteron teuchophoroides (Meuffels & Grootaert, 1987)
 Chaetogonopteron thienemanni (Stackelberg, 1931)
 Chaetogonopteron tokoi Bickel, 2016
 Chaetogonopteron torrenticola (Meuffels & Grootaert, 1987)
 Chaetogonopteron tricornigerum (Meuffels & Grootaert, 1987)
 Chaetogonopteron vagum (Becker, 1922)
 Chaetogonopteron ventrale Yang & Saigusa, 2001
 Chaetogonopteron ventriseta Liao, Zhou & Yang, 2008
 Chaetogonopteron vexillum Bickel, 2013
 Chaetogonopteron vermiculatum (Parent, 1932)
 Chaetogonopteron wuhuaense Wang, Yang & Grootaert, 2005
 Chaetogonopteron zhangae Wang, Yang & Grootaert, 2005
 Chaetogonopteron zhuae Liao, Zhou & Yang, 2008

References

 Europe
 Nearctic

Dolichopodidae genera
Sympycninae